Carrol P. Orrison (May 19, 1929 – December 25, 2016) was an American politician in the state of Wyoming. He served in the Wyoming House of Representatives as a member of the Democratic Party. He attended the University of Wyoming and Allen University, and was a brewery owner and wholesale distributor. He owned Casper Beverage in Casper and Orrison Distributing. He died on Christmas Day 2016.

References

1929 births
2016 deaths
Democratic Party members of the Wyoming House of Representatives
University of Wyoming alumni
Allen University alumni
People from Sapulpa, Oklahoma
Businesspeople from Wyoming
20th-century American businesspeople
Politicians from Oklahoma